Georgian heraldry was largely suppressed during the Soviet era, but after Georgia's independence, it has been revived. It draws inspiration from Russian and Western European heraldic traditions as well as its own.

Since 2008, Georgia has the State Council of Heraldry under the national parliament.

References